The Vossloh G1206 is a B'B' diesel hydraulic freight locomotive built in Kiel and used by several European railway operators including a SNCF specific variant the BB 461000 series.

The design was created in the mid-1990s by Maschinenbau Kiel (MaK) for German coal supplier RAG Aktiengesellschaft and is a follow-on to the MaK G1205 locomotive class built as the SNCB Class 77. Production continued under Vossloh ownership of the Kiel plant

In 2007 a shunting specific variant, the G1206-2 was created and began production.

Four Caterpillar-engined locomotives hired from Angel Trains Cargo by Euro Cargo Rail were assigned to TOPS Class 21 due to their presence at times on the UK side of the channel tunnel. ECR assigned the codes FB1544 to FB1547 to these locomotives.

History and design
In the 1990s the de-monopolisation and liberalisation of the railways of member states of the European Union meant that private companies could access formerly state-owned track. With this came numerous private operators running locomotives on the main line for the first time. MaK had previously been quite successful in providing freight locomotives for industrial use to various companies. The G 1201 and G 1205 models (and intermediate variants) had been examples of the type of locomotives larger private companies had used. These locomotives were suitable for pulling fairly heavy freight consists as well as shunting. However track access charges (as well as the necessity not to interrupt passenger trains) meant that on the main lines freight trains must run much faster than they did in an industrial environment.

As a consequence Vossloh introduced the G 1206; it was based on the G 1205 but was substantially more powerful allowing it to pull freight trains at a higher speed (or simply pull heavier trains). Thus the 12-cylinder engine of the G 1205 was replaced with a 16-cylinder engine, because of this along with the increase size of the auxiliary equipment required the new locomotive was almost 2 metres longer than its  predecessor.

The cab is situated approximately above one of the bogies, with doors opening onto walkways on both sides along the rest of the locomotive; the external design is functional, with flat steels and right angles predominating.

Variants and orders
The initial versions had a MTU engine (the 16 V 396 TC14); two variants were built either with or without a two-speed voith transmission - versions with the two-speed transmissions had a lower gear limiting the maximum speed to ~ but giving greater torque.

A further four machines were built with a single gear transmission otherwise identical design except for the use of a 12-cylinder engine from MTU of almost equal power to the previous 16-cylinder version; these were for Dortmunder Eisenbahn GmbH (literally Dortmund railway). They were numbered 401 to 404, number 403 can be seen here in action in its green and yellow livery:

The design then underwent further improvement; the improved bogies used in the machines for Banverket were made standard with improvements to the axlebox. With these changes the basic design of the main tranche of G 1206's was complete.

The introduction of the Caterpillar engine led to a slight change in external appearance - previously the fore and aft sections had been practically identical in height, but to accommodate the Caterpillar engine the 'fore' (longer) section was raised slightly.

This model was used by SNCF as the BB 461000, as well as numerous private operators. Many of the locomotives produced are owned by Alpha Trains, with a further significant number owned by Mitsui Rail Capital, both these companies lease the locomotives to private operators, sometimes for short periods of time. They have been used all over Europe: In Germany, Austria,  Switzerland, Luxembourg, Italy, Spain and the Netherlands.

In April 2006, another variant was produced, this time for Seco Rail, the engine specified was the MTU 12V 4000 R41 which was the type meeting the European emissions standards at that time. The two-speed hydraulic transmission from Voith (L54r zseU2) was used again - giving a top speed of  depending on gear. The locomotives were equipped for use in France.

Summary

G1206-2

The G1206-2 is a shunting variant of the G1206 with a smaller engine and transmission. Because of the smaller engine only one cooling fan is needed - this is the only external difference between this type and its 'big sister'. Operators include Eisenbahn und Häfen GmbH (~7 units), Dillinger Hüttenwerke (1 unit), Ruhr Oel GmbH (also used by BP Gelsenkirchen GmbH) (1 unit).

Models of the G1206

Models of the G1206 have been produced in HO scale by Mehano and PIKO, and in N scale by Piko. Trix/Minitrix has also produced G1206 models in HO and N scales using operator's liveries' applied on similar models of MaK/Vossloh machines such as their reproductions of NS Class 6400, or MaK G 1205.

References and notes

Other sources
VSFT G1206 BB Technical and operator details, as well as images of Private company liveried locomotives.
G 1206 and G 1206-2 technical pamphlet from vossloh-locomotives.com
G 1205/G 1206/DLL  Info Banverket G-series jarnvag.net
Die G1206 in Deutschland und Frankreich  Images with descriptions of G1206 in Germany and France from nahnejohannsen.de (German)
Diesel Lok G 1206 Images of G1206 in Luxembourg from rail.lu

External links

Angel Trains data sheet G 1206

MaK locomotives
Vossloh G1206
Railway locomotives introduced in 1997
Standard gauge locomotives of Sweden
Standard gauge locomotives of Germany
Standard gauge locomotives of Great Britain
Diesel-hydraulic locomotives of Germany
B-B locomotives
Freight locomotives